Niella Tanaro is a comune (municipality) in the Province of Cuneo in the Italian region Piedmont, located about  south of Turin and about  east of Cuneo.

Niella Tanaro borders the following municipalities: Briaglia, Castellino Tanaro, Cigliè, Lesegno, Mondovì, Rocca Cigliè, San Michele Mondovì, and Vicoforte.

References

Cities and towns in Piedmont